Meyer Rubin (February 17, 1924 – May 2, 2020) was an American geologist known for his radiocarbon dating work with the United States Geological Survey.

Early career 
After graduating from Englewood High School, South Side, Chicago, in 1941, he attended the Woodrow Wilson Junior College, Chicago (now the Kennedy–King College). In the spring of 1943, Rubin enlisted into a University of Chicago run pre-meteorology training program (class "B") for the United States Army Air Forces (AAF); active duty effective March 3, 1943.  Basic training was at Fort Sheridan with classes held at the University of Michigan.  Rubin finished his training in September 1943, and was commissioned as a Second Lieutenant. He was shipped off first to Port Moresby, New Guinea, and then later to the Philippines, to help forecast weather for AAF long range flights in the Pacific Theater of World War II.  After Japan surrendered, Rubin was sent to Tokyo as part of the post war occupation.

Rubin returned to the States in 1946 and attended, on the G.I. Bill, the University of Chicago, from which he earned his bachelor’s and master's degree, and later his Ph.D. in Geology (Prof. Leland Horberg, advisor).

Rubin joined the U.S. Geological Survey, Washington, D.C., on June 14, 1950, as a member of the Branch of Military Geology, then led by Frank C. Whitmore, Jr.

Radiocarbon laboratory 
In 1952, Hans E. Suess was hired by the U.S. Geological Survey (USGS) to set up a radiocarbon dating laboratory in Washington, D.C. and built the radiocarbon apparatus in a basement space in the GSA Building (former Department of the Interior Building) located at 1800 F St., NW.  A basement space was needed due to the extreme mass of the two steel and lead shielded counter assemblies.  In early 1953, Corrine Alexander joined the radiocarbon project, followed by Rubin in December of the same year.  
Routine radiocarbon  measurements were begun in the summer of 1953.

Willard Libby, inventor of the  dating method and 1960 Nobel Prize winner used a solid carbon method for sample determination, whereas Suess, upon seeing Libby's method in Chicago knew that he would try the gas, acetylene C2H2, as he had success with acetylene in the 1930s in Germany for other radiochemical determinations.
This was a significant step as it allowed more efficient counting and easy movement of the counting material between the extraction apparatus, gas purification line and the two counters.  Rubin initially assisted in the acetylene preparation, and as a geologist provided valuable input on the selection of samples and interpretation of results.  In the first two years, the laboratory produced approximately 200  age determinations, which were critically important to unravel the various details of the most recent Pleistocene glaciation, the Wisconsin stage, among other geological problems.

Rubin became director of the USGS Radiocarbon Laboratory in 1955 when Suess left to set up a new laboratory at Scripps Institute of Oceanography, La Jolla, CA.

The next few years at the USGS were devoted to perfecting the acetylene technique and applying it to a multitude of geological and archaeological research. Rubin continued his research on the Wisconsin glacial stage and used the results for his doctoral dissertation, earning his Ph.D. from the University of Chicago in 1956.

In 1973, Rubin and the laboratory moved into a newly built USGS national headquarters in Reston, Virginia.

Rubin kept a room full of samples in the lab as part of the "tour," which included samples he said were wood relics from King Solomon's mines and the Queen of Sheba's palace, linen wraps from the Dead Sea Scrolls, and a large piece of whale baleen.  He also kept a guest book he would ask visitors to sign.

History of work 
In April 1955, Rubin and Suess published the second set of  results from the lab's first year of operation.  One of their main focuses was on establishing an absolute time scale for the Wisconsin glaciation substages prior to what was known as the Mankato substage (the most recent glacial advance, around 9,000-11,000 years ago).  Suess's acetylene method for carbon counting extended the dating range back to approximately 45,000 years, making it possible to fix in time pre-Mankato glacial events by dating wood and other organic material from older glacial deposits.
Richard Foster Flint assembled a collection of samples that were dated at the lab.  Some of the samples were collected by Rubin in collaboration with other geologists such as J Harlen Bretz (who was Rubin's Geomorphology professor at UChicago), Carl Leland Horberg, William John Wayne, Richard Parker Goldthwait, James Zumberge, and Donald Eschman.  Samples were collected by other collectors as well.  Flint and Rubin published a brief assessment of the stratigraphic meaning of these samples and their  age determinations in May 1955. One of the conclusions was that a major glaciation began 25,000 or more years ago and reached a maximum about 20,000 years ago.  The  results were consistent.

In 1963, Rubin questioned the validity of  dates from sea snail shells.  Experiments showed that snails could uptake 10-12 percent inorganic carbonate from limestone, yielding an uncertainty in the  dates of approximately one thousand years.

In 1964, Rubin and A. A. Rosen, of the U.S. Public Health Service, showed that by measuring  content of surface water it is possible to determine the relative contributions of industrial pollution (from fossil fuels) and domestic pollution (from domestic sewage and garbage) in streams—desirable information for planning abatement measures.  An activated carbon filter system was used to collect samples of organic contaminants in water, which were then extracted using chloroform and ethanol, and converted to acetylene for  measurement, making use of a double-tube combustion system developed to completely burn the highly flammable samples in a controlled manner.  Fossil carbon such as petroleum, natural gas, and coal is depleted in  compared to the contemporary carbon in animal and plant matter.  Their data was reported as a proportion of contemporary carbon to fossil carbon, and the results where consistent with the known pollution sources at the chosen sample sites, and provided new information at sites where this proportion could not be predicted by other means.  This work was expanded upon in 1975 by Spiker and Rubin, when they published a water pollution study describing the measurement of  activity of dissolved organic carbon (DOC) in surface water and groundwater, this time applying high-intensity ultraviolet radiation to large water samples to convert DOC to  via photo-oxidation, for  measurement.  This was one of the early investigations of groundwater DOC impacted by industrial and municipal pollution.

In 1965, Bruce B. Hanshaw, William Back, and Rubin determined the origin of saline water contaminating the Ocala Limestone aquifer near Brunswick, Georgia by measuring the  activity of water in and around the aquifer.  They found that the contamination was coming from the underlying Claiborne Group, which had relatively low  content due to lack of exposure to atmospheric carbon, and not from the nearby ocean.  These results were in agreement with previous investigations using piezometric maps and other more traditional hydrologic data.  This work laid the foundation for the use of carbon isotopes to delineate flow systems in regional carbonate aquifers.

First publishing together in 1967, George Plafker, Rubin, and their colleagues did painstaking fieldwork after the magnitude 9.2 Alaskan earthquake in 1964, covering hundreds of kilometers of Alaskan shoreline in small boats, helicopters, and float-equipped aircraft after the 1964 quake helped to launch a new field of megathrust earthquake geology, which used observations of the placement and  dating of intertidal organisms such as acorn barnacles, mussels and rockweed to determine the amounts of vertical change in land relative to sea level near subduction zones.  Plafker and his colleagues determined that the massive Alaskan quake was caused by rupture along a deeply buried fault in a subduction zone where the Pacific tectonic plate thrusts north below the North American plate. Earlier accounts of the Alaskan earthquake had suggested that the quake took place as slip along a vertical fault, as the Pacific plate rotated counter-clockwise against the North American plate. These studies by Plafker, Rubin and colleagues were very important evidence for the existence of subduction processes during the early debates of plate tectonics. See  for a geological and historical summary.

In 1968, Rubin co-authored with John Chapman Frye, H. B. Willman, and R. F. Black the official USGS "Definition of Wisconsinan Stage," which defined and described the Wisconsinan Stage of the Pleistocene and its substages as time-stratigraphic units for use in Illinois and Wisconsin.

In 1973, Rubin dated charcoal from campfires used by Paleo-Indians at Flint Run Complex in the Shenandoah Valley, Virginia, to be 10,000 years old—the oldest evidence of man in the state at the time.

Rubin thoroughly analyzed Mount St. Helens in the years and months preceding its 1980 eruption.
He worked with Dwight Crandell and Donal R. Mullineaux on their paper published in 1975, which correctly predicted an eruption could occur before the turn of the century.

In 1977, Rubin collaborated with Harry E. Gove and others in early demonstrations of successful  measurement using accelerator mass spectrometry (AMS) at the University of Rochester.
Development of this technique made possible the 1988 radiocarbon dating of the Shroud of Turin, as it allowed for much smaller samples to be used.  Gove had a central role in the Shroud project and brought Rubin in for his expertise.

What is today the Great Salt Lake in Utah was previously a massive Lake Bonneville which covered most of northern Utah.  Rubin and colleagues determined the changing levels of this ancient lake including a catastrophic flood caused by a sudden overflow of the lake, known as the Bonneville flood.  This very exciting epoch in the geologic history of North America was followed chronologically by Rubin in a series a radiocarbon dates, which contributed to publications such as "Great Salt Lake, and precursors, Utah: the last 30,000 years" (1984).

In August 1986, thousands of people were found dead on the shores of Lake Nyos, Cameroon.  John P. Lockwood and Rubin found that the lake's maar may have been formed by an explosive eruption, and that  could still be trapped under the lake—its gradual release into the waters setting the stage for the tragic gas-release event.

Rubin and colleagues contributed to our understanding of the evolution of Hawaiian volcanoes through hundreds of  measurements starting in the late 60's, sample selection refinements, and significant publications in 1987.

Rubin carried out  work, in collaboration with Lucio Lirer and Giuseppe Rolandi (University of Naples Federico II), a collaboration arranged by Rubin's long-time friend and fellow geologist Harvey E. Belkin, determining the age of the Breccia Museo (museum breccia), a proximal deposit attributed to the 39,000 BCE eruption of the Campanian Ignimbrite. The Breccia Museo deposit is controversial regarding its chronology and origin and this study added to that discussion and the realization that the deposit may be more complex and varied than had been understood.

Awards and honors 
In 1956, Rubin received a Washington Academy of Sciences Award in the Physical Sciences.

In 1974, Rubin received a Department of the Interior Meritorious Service Award.

Rubin was designated as a Scientist Emeritus for the Eastern Geology & Paleoclimate Science Center, now renamed the Florence Bascom Geoscience Center, Reston, VA, by the USGS.

On a less serious note, Rubin was also given the 1962 Geological Society of Washington Sleeping Bear Award for best humor during a GSW meeting.

Personal life 
Rubin was born in Chicago to Ukrainian-Jewish immigrants from Kiev.  He met his wife, Mary Louise Rubin ( Tucker), in high school. They raised three sons, John, Robert, and Mark, and were married for 72 years before she died in 2015.

Rubin made close friends through the US Army Air Force weatherman training, in Frank Wrobel, Mick McCullough, and Frank Getz, who were all shipped to different Pacific theaters during the war. Rubin was also close friends with Edward C. T. Chao, who is known for coesite, stishovite, and tektites, as they were both at one time in the USGS Branch of Military Geology, though they had no scientific relationship.

Rubin and Art Buchwald had at least two things in common — humor and kidney stones.  Enabled by go-between Frank Forrester, "Project BUCHWALDSTONE" was a spoof project in which Rubin, Ed Dwornik and other scientists studied Buchwald's kidney stones, which were, according to Rubin, much smaller than his own.

Rubin was an avid kayaker in his prime, known on the Potomac River as "Dr. Kayak" by many. He wrote a spoof advice column in "The Cruiser" (newsletter of the Canoe Cruisers Association) under the same title. Rubin was also an enthusiastic collector of found bobbers.

He tested positive for COVID-19 during the COVID-19 pandemic in Virginia, and died a few days later.

Publications

References

External links 
 Meyer Rubin on Google Scholar
 Forever bobbing baubles

1924 births
2020 deaths
University of Chicago alumni
United States Geological Survey personnel
20th-century American geologists
People from Vienna, Virginia
Military personnel from Illinois
Scientists from Chicago
United States Army Air Forces personnel of World War II
Jewish American scientists
American people of Ukrainian-Jewish descent
Deaths from the COVID-19 pandemic in Virginia
Englewood Technical Prep Academy alumni